Richard Cumberland was  Archdeacon of Northampton from 1707 until 1737.

He was the son of Richard Cumberland, an English philosopher  and Bishop of Peterborough from 1691 to 1718. Cumberland was born in Peterborough and educated at Queens' College, Cambridge. He held incumbencies at  Elton and Peakirk; and was a Prebendary of Peterborough and Lincoln.

He died on 24 December 1737.

Notes

1710 births
People from Peterborough
Alumni of Queens' College, Cambridge
Archdeacons of Northampton
1737 deaths